The engine pressure ratio (EPR) is the total pressure ratio across a jet engine, measured as the ratio of the total pressure at the exit of the propelling nozzle divided by the total pressure at the entry to the compressor.

Jet engines use either EPR or compressor/fan RPM as an indicator of thrust. When EPR is used, the pressures are measured in front of the compressor and behind the turbine.

Integrated engine pressure ratio 

The integrated engine pressure ratio (IEPR) is the ratio of the pressure at the core engine exhaust and fan discharge pressure compared to the intake pressure to the gas turbine engine.  The IEPR is an engine indicator system unique to the Rolls-Royce RB211.

See also 
Jet engine performance
Turbofan

References 

 The Boeing Company  Engine thrust control system  US Patent 4248042 Includes Boeing's discussion on EPR or IEPR being a better indicator of thrust.

External links 
 Pressure Variation EPR - NASA Animation

Engineering ratios
Aircraft engines